Buranovo is a rural locality (a selo) in Kabanovsky Selsoviet, Ust-Kalmansky District, Altai Krai, Russia. The population was 207 as of 2013. There are 5 streets.

Geography 
Buranovo is located 36 km southwest of Ust-Kalmanka (the district's administrative centre) by road. Ust-Yermilikha is the nearest rural locality.

References 

Rural localities in Ust-Kalmansky District